Molleturo is a town and parish in Cuenca Canton, Azuay Province, Ecuador. The parish covers an area of 853.4 km² and according to the 2001 Ecuadorian census it had a population total of 5,221.

References

Populated places in Azuay Province
Parishes of Ecuador